Professor Dato' Lam Sai Kit (born 23 June 1938 in Ipoh, Perak) is a prominent Malaysian scientist who was central to the discovery of the Nipah virus that causes severe disease in both animals and humans. Prof Lam is currently an emeritus professor at the Faculty of Medicine, University of Malaya as well as a Research Consultant at University of Malaya, and he nurtures the young scientists particularly through the High Impact Research (HIR) grant.

He won the Merdeka Award which is one of the most prestigious scientist awards from Government of Malaysia.

He is also a member of International Advisory Council in Universiti Tunku Abdul Rahman.

References

Living people
People from Ipoh
1938 births
Malaysian people of Chinese descent
Academic staff of the University of Malaya
Malaysian virologists